Laredo Ranchettes is a census-designated place (CDP) in Webb County, Texas, United States. The population was 22 at the 2010 census.

Geography
Laredo Ranchettes is located at  (27.491169, -99.359960).

According to the United States Census Bureau in 2000, the CDP has a total area of 24.2 square miles (62.7 km2), of which, 24.1 square miles (62.4 km2) of it is land and 0.1 square miles (0.3 km2) of it (0.45%) is water. This CDP lost area in the changes in Webb County prior to the 2010 census.

Demographics
As of the census of 2010 there were 22 people, in the census of 2000 there were 1,845 people, 463 households, and 405 families residing in the CDP. The population density was 76.6 people per square mile (29.6/km2). There were 611 housing units at an average density of 25.4/sq mi (9.8/km2). The racial makeup of the CDP was 84.66% White, 0.54% African American, 0.60% Native American, 10.51% from other races, and 3.69% from two or more races. Hispanic or Latino people of any race were 96.37% of the population.

There were 463 households, out of which 60.7% had children under the age of 18 living with them, 69.1% were married couples living together, 11.9% had a female householder with no husband present, and 12.5% were non-families. 10.8% of all households were made up of individuals, and 5.2% had someone living alone who was 65 years of age or older. The average household size was 3.98 and the average family size was 4.34.

In the CDP, the population was spread out, with 42.4% under the age of 18, 12.5% from 18 to 24, 25.4% from 25 to 44, 14.0% from 45 to 64, and 5.7% who were 65 years of age or older. The median age was 22 years. For every 100 females, there were 107.5 males. For every 100 females age 18 and over, there were 101.7 males.

The median income for a household in the CDP was $18,029, and the median income for a family was $19,087. Males had a median income of $18,571 versus $14,219 for females. The per capita income for the CDP was $13,194. About 44.6% of families and 47.6% of the population were below the poverty line, including 48.9% of those under age 18 and 24.6% of those age 65 or over.

Education
Residents are in the United Independent School District. Zoned schools include: Freedom Elementary School, Raul Perales Middle School, and United South High School.

The designated community college for Webb County is Laredo Community College.

References

Census-designated places in Texas
Census-designated places in Webb County, Texas